Following is a list of justices of the Louisiana Supreme Court and their years of service.

Territory of Orleans (1804–1812)
(three judges)
John Bartow Prevost 1804–1806
Ephraim Kirby 1804 (died en route to New Orleans)
Peter Stephen Du Ponceau 1804 (declined Jefferson's appointment)
William Sprigg 1806–1808
George Mathews Jr. 1806–1813
Joshua Lewis 1807–1813
John Thompson 1808–1810
Francois Xavier Martin 1810–1813

State of Louisiana (1813 to the present)

Constitution of 1812
(three to five judges appointed by the governor)
Dominic Augustin Hall 1813, Presiding Judge
Pierre Derbigny 1813–1820
George Mathews Jr. 1813–1836, Presiding Judge
Francois Xavier Martin 1815–1836;
Alexander Porter 1821–1833
Henry Adams Bullard 1834–1839
Francois Xavier Martin 1836–1846, Presiding Judge
Henry Carleton 1837–1839
Pierre Adolphe Rost 1839
George Eustis Sr. 1839
George Strawbridge 1839
Rice Garland 1840–1846
Alonzo Morphy 1839–1846
Henry Adams Bullard 1840–1846
Florent Edouard Simon 1840–1846

Constitution of 1845 
(three associate justices and one chief justice)
Pierre Adolphe Rost 1846–1854
George Eustis Sr. 1846–1853, Chief Justice
George Rogers King 1846–1850
Thomas Slidell 1846–1853; 1853–1855, Chief Justice
Isaac Trimble Preston 1850–1852

Constitution of 1852 
(four associate justices elected in districts and one chief justice elected at-large)
William Dunbar 1852–1853
Cornelius Voorhies 1853–1859
Alexander McKenzie Buchanan 1853–1862
Abner Nash Ogden 1853–1855
James G. Campbell 1853–1854
Henry M. Spofford 1854–1858
James Neilson Lea 1855–1857
Edwin T. Merrick 1855–1865, Chief Justice
James L. Cole 1857–1860
Thomas T. Land 1858–1865
Albert Voorhies 1859–1865
Albert Duffel 1860–1865
Pierre Emile Bonford 1863–1864
Thomas Courtland Manning 1864–1865

Constitution of 1864 
(four associate justices and one chief justice appointed by the governor for 8 year terms)
William B. Hyman 1865–1868, Chief Justice
Zenon Labauve Jr. 1865–1868

Rufus K. Howell 1865–1877
John Henry Ilsley 1865–1868
Robert Byron Jones 1865–1866
James G. Taliaferro 1866–1876
John T. Ludeling 1868–1877, Chief Justice
William Gillespie Wyly 1868–1876
William Wirt Howe 1868–1872
John H. Kennard 1872–1873
Philip H. Morgan 1873–1877
John E. Leonard 1876–1877
John Edward King 1877
Thomas Courtland Manning 1877–1880, Chief Justice
Robert Hardin Marr 1877–1880
Alcibiade De Blanc 1877–1880
William B. Giles Egan 1877–1878
William B. Spencer 1877–1880
Edward Douglass White 1879–1880

Constitution of 1879
 (four associate justices and one chief justice appointed by the governor for 12 year terms)
Edouard Bermudez 1880–1892, Chief Justice
Felix Pierre Poché 1880–1890
Robert Barr Todd 1880–1888
William M. Levy 1880–1882
Charles Erasmus Fenner 1880–1893
Thomas Courtland Manning 1882–1886
Samuel D. McEnery 1888–1891
Lynn B. Watkins 1886–1901
Joseph Arsenne Breaux 1890–1904; 1904–1914, Chief Justice
Francis T. Nicholls 1892–1904; 1904–1911, Chief Justice
Charles Parlange 1893–1894
Henry C. Miller 1894–1899
Newton C. Blanchard 1897–1903

Constitution of 1898 
(five justices appointed by the governor, with the chief justice determined by time in service)
Frank A. Monroe 1899–1914; 1914–1921, Chief Justice
Olivier O. Provosty 1901–1922; 1922, Chief Justice
Alfred D. Land 1903–1917
Walter B. Sommerville 1911–1921
Joseph Arsenne Breaux 1904–1914, Chief Justice

Constitution of 1913 
(five justices elected by the people, with the chief justice determined by time in service)
Charles Austin O'Niell 1914–1922; 1922–1949, Chief Justice
Paul Leche 1917–1919
Benjamin C. Dawkins Sr. 1918–1924

Constitution of 1921 
(seven justices elected by the people, with the chief justice determined by time in service)
Joshua G. Baker 1921–1922
Robert Reid 1923–1923
David N. Thompson 1922–1930
Winston Overton 1921–1934
John St. Paul 1922–1934
John R. Land 1921–1941
Wynne Grey Rogers 1922–1946
Harney Felix Brunot 1923–1936
Frederick M. Odom 1931–1945
Archibald T. Higgins 1934–1945
John B. Fournet 1935–1970; 1949–1970, Chief Justice
Amos Lee Ponder Jr. 1937–1959
Robert F. Kennon 1945–1946
E. Howard McCaleb Jr. 1941–1943; 1947–1970; 1971–1972, Chief Justice
Frank W. Hawthorne 1945–1968
Joe Busbey Hamiter 1943–1970; Chief Justice 1970
Nathaniel W. Bond 1947–1948
Harold A. Moise 1948–1958
J. Cleveland Frugé 1949
Samuel A. LeBlanc 1949–1954
James D. Simon 1955–1960
Albert Tate Jr. 1970–1979
Walter B. Hamlin 1958–1972; 1972–1973, Chief Justice
Rene A. Viosca 1959–1960
Joe W. Sanders 1960–1973; 1973–1978, Chief Justice
Frank Summers 1960–1978; 1979–1980, Chief Justice
Mack E. Barham 1968–1975
John Allen Dixon Jr. 1971–1980; 1980–1990, Chief Justice
Pascal F. Calogero Jr. 1973–1990; 1990–2008, Chief Justice
Walter F. Marcus Jr. 1973–2000

Constitution of 1974 
(seven justices elected in single-member districts after reapportionment by legislation effective in the year 2000; the chief justice is determined seniority of service)
James L. Dennis 1975–1995
Fred A. Blanche Jr. 1979–1986
Jack C. Watson 1979–1996
Harry T. Lemmon 1980–2001
Luther F. Cole 1986–1992
Pike Hall Jr. 1990–1994
Catherine D. Kimball 1992–2009; 2009–2013, Chief Justice 
Revius Ortique Jr. 1993–1994
Bernette Joshua Johnson 1994–2020; 2013–2020, Chief Justice
Jeffrey P. Victory 1995–2014
E. Joseph Bleich 1996
Jeannette Knoll 1997–2016
Chet D. Traylor 1997–2009
John L. Weimer 2001–present; 2021–present, Chief Justice
Greg G. Guidry 2009–2019
Marcus R. Clark 2009–2020
Jefferson D. Hughes III 2013–present
Scott J. Crichton 2015–present
James T. Genovese 2017–present
William J. Crain 2019–present
Jay McCallum 2021–present
Piper D. Griffin 2021–present

References
Celebration of the Centenary of the Supreme Court of Louisiana by Henry Dart (1913)
"Louisiana Supreme Court Justices." http://www.lasc.org/about_the_court/justices_bio.asp. Retrieved September 18, 2015.

Justices of the Louisiana Supreme Court
Louisiana law
Louisiana state courts
Louisiana
Justices
Territory of Orleans